Jani Master (born Shaik Jani Basha; 2 July 1982) is an Indian dance choreographer who predominantly works in Telugu cinema. He has also worked in Kannada, Tamil, and Hindi films. He choreographs in a wide range of dancing styles, but he is mostly known for his western and folk style dancing.

Career
Jani Master began his film work as a dancer in Telugu films and on the ETV's Telugu Television Reality-dance show Dhee Ultimate Dance Show, before being given the chance to choreograph in Drona, a 2009 Telugu film. Actor Ram Charan employed him as choreographer of the dances for 2012 Telugu film Racha. Ram Charan appointed him as choreographer in all of his films.  He then worked for other actors such as: Pawan Kalyan, Allu Arjun, N. T. Rama Rao Jr., Ram Pothineni, Ravi Teja. He has also sung a song dedicated to Ram Charan.

In 2014, Bollywood actor Salman Khan appointed Jani Master for Jai Ho as choreographer. He also choreographs award ceremonies. He continues to choreograph in feature films. He has contributed to two Television Reality-dance shows as a choreographer and as a mentor. His awards include Filmfare Awards, CineMAA Awards and South Indian International Movie Awards. From 2017, he is one of the judges on various Telugu Television reality-dance shows such as Neethone Dance on the Star Maa.

In 2018, he was the choreographer for the film MLA. In the same year he worked as an assistant to Prabhudeva for a Tamil song, Rowdy Baby from the film Maari 2 brought so much of recognition, as the song became a viral hit for its choreography across Indian subcontinent and other parts of the world.

Later, in 2020 he once again received praise for his choreography for Butta Bomma song from the Telugu film Ala Vaikunthapurramuloo.The rolling step in the music video became as a signature step. It was recreated by many celebrities and million others across various social media and short-video making entertainment platforms. This song also became a hit.

Filmography

TV shows and appearances

Awards and nominations

References

External links
 

Indian film choreographers
Living people
1982 births
Dancers from Andhra Pradesh
People from Nellore
Indian choreographers
Filmfare Awards South winners
Indian male dancers
People from Andhra Pradesh
Santosham Film Awards winners
People from Nellore district
South Indian International Movie Awards winners
CineMAA Awards winners